Partridge Nunatak is the westernmost of three aligned nunataks lying southward of the Ickes Mountains in Marie Byrd Land. The nunatak (730 m) is located along the north side of White Glacier, about 5 nautical miles (9 km) west of Bailey Nunatak. Mapped by United States Geological Survey (USGS) from surveys and U.S. Navy air photos, 1959–65. Named by Advisory Committee on Antarctic Names (US-ACAN) for Billy W. Partridge, EOC, U.S. Navy, Chief Equipment Operator at Byrd Station, 1966.

Nunataks of Marie Byrd Land